The South Africa national cricket team toured Australia from November 1910 to March 1911 to play five test matches against Australia.

Before the first test, the South Africans played in five warm-up matches before the first of five tests that was held in the series. After the Australians won the first two tests in Sydney and Melbourne, the South Africans would record a win in the third test in Adelaide by 28 runs. Three more tour matches against Tasmania and Victoria were played before the fourth test in Melbourne where the Australians won the series by 530 runs. After a tour match against New South Wales a week prior, the South Africans would go on to lose the final test match by seven wickets.

Aubrey Faulkner was leading the run scorer for the series with 732 runs from ten innings, while the leading wicket taker was Australian bowler Bill Whitty who took 37 wickets in ten innings.

Background
The 1910–11 series was the first time that the South Africans had toured Australia. This was also the second series between these nations with the first tour being the 1902–03 tour of South Africa where Australia had won the series 2–0. For the South Africans, their last series was at home to England in 1909-10 with the South Africans recording a 3–2 series victory. Australia on the other hand had won their last series 2–1 against England back in the 1909 Ashes series.

Test series summary

First Test

Second Test

Third Test

Fourth Test

Fifth Test

References

External links
 South Africa tour of Australia 1910–11 on ESPN Cricinfo

1910 in Australian cricket
1910 in South African cricket
1911 in Australian cricket
1911 in South African cricket
Australian cricket seasons from 1890–91 to 1917–18
International cricket competitions from 1888–89 to 1918
1910-11